Thure Frank Lindhardt (born 24 December 1974) is a Danish actor, educated at the drama school at Odense Theatre in 1998.

Life and career
Lindhardt was born in Copenhagen, and grew up in Roskilde. At the age of 12, he got a part in Bille August's film Pelle the Conqueror. His breakthrough in Denmark came with his portrayal of a boy with autism in A Place Nearby, co-starring with Ghita Nørby.

Since then, he has played parts in a variety of movies and series, including Into the Wild, Angels in Fast Motion aka Nordkraft, Brotherhood, Love in Thoughts, Sugar Rush, Princess, Rejseholdet, Byzantium and Flame & Citron, a movie about the World War II resistance group Holger Danske, in which Lindhardt played Bent Faurschou-Hviid, co-starring with Mads Mikkelsen.

He also played a role as the young Swiss Guard Lieutenant Chartrand in the 2009 film Angels & Demons, directed by Ron Howard.

He co-starred in Ira Sachs's film Keep the Lights On, which premiered at the Sundance Film Festival in January 2012. Later in 2012, he was nominated for a Gotham Independent Film Award for Breakthrough Actor as well as an Independent Spirit Award for Best Male Lead.

In the third season of Showtime's The Borgias, Lindhardt starred opposite Jeremy Irons, playing Rufio, a ruthless assassin working under Catherina Sforza (portrayed by Gina McKee) to bring about the Borgias' downfall.

In 2012 Lindhardt played a role in the European-Scandinavian TV series The Spiral, and in 2013 he appeared in the feature film Adieu Paris.

In 2014 he received the Lauritzen Award.

In 2015 he played the Danish detective Henrik Sabroe opposite Sofia Helin in season 3 of the Danish-Swedish TV police series The Bridge. He replaced Kim Bodnia as a lead. He reprised the role in the show's fourth and final season, broadcast in early 2018.

Personal life 
In May 2010, he broke up with his boyfriend of two years Silas Holst.
In autumn 2017, he became a father to his daughter, Billie.

Filmography

References

External links

1974 births
Danish male film actors
Living people
People from Roskilde
Danish gay actors